Slam Dunk (stylized as SLAM DUNK) is a Japanese sports manga series written and illustrated by Takehiko Inoue. It was serialized in Shueisha's shōnen manga magazine Weekly Shōnen Jump from October 1990 to June 1996, with the chapters collected into 31 tankōbon volumes. It tells the story of a basketball team from Shōhoku High School in the Shōnan area of Japan.

The manga was adapted into an anime television series by Toei Animation which aired from October 1993 to March 1996 and has been broadcast worldwide, enjoying much popularity particularly in Japan, several other Asian countries and Europe. An anime feature film, titled The First Slam Dunk, was released in Japan in December 2022.

Slam Dunk has 170 million copies in circulation, making it the seventh best-selling manga series in history. In 1994, it received the 40th Shogakukan Manga Award for the shōnen category. In 2010, Inoue received special commendations from the Japan Basketball Association for helping popularize basketball in Japan.

Plot

Hanamichi Sakuragi is a delinquent and the leader of a gang. Sakuragi is very unpopular with girls, having been rejected an astonishing fifty times. In his first year at Shohoku High School, he meets Haruko Akagi, the girl of his dreams, and is overjoyed when she is not repulsed or scared of him like all the other girls he has asked out. Haruko, recognizing Sakuragi's athleticism, introduces him to the Shohoku basketball team. Sakuragi is reluctant to join the team at first, as he has no prior experience in sports and thinks that basketball is a game for losers because his fiftieth rejection was in favor of a basketball player. Despite his extreme immaturity and fiery temper, he proves to be a natural athlete and joins the team, mainly in the hopes of impressing and getting closer to Haruko.

Later on, Sakuragi realizes that he has come to actually love the sport, despite having previously played primarily because of his crush on Haruko. Kaede Rukawa—Sakuragi's bitter rival (both in basketball and because Haruko has a massive crush, albeit one-sided, on Rukawa), the star rookie and a "girl magnet"—joins the team at the same time. Not long after, Hisashi Mitsui, a skilled three-point shooter and ex–junior high school MVP, and Ryota Miyagi, a short but fast point guard, both rejoin the team and together these four struggle to fulfill team captain Takenori Akagi's dream of winning the national championship. Together, these misfits gain publicity and the once little-known Shohoku basketball team becomes an all-star contender in Japan who gained a popularity after defeating one of the powerhouse highschool teams at Interhigh.

Production
Inoue became inspired to make Slam Dunk as he liked basketball since his high school years. After Inoue started Slam Dunk, he was surprised when he began receiving letters from readers that said they started playing the sport due to the manga. His editor even told him "basketball was a taboo in this world." Due to these letters, Inoue decided he wanted to draw better basketball games in the series. With the series, Inoue wanted to demonstrate the feelings from some athletes such as their thoughts when they win, lose or improve at their sport. When he started making Vagabond, he noted that when he was doing Slam Dunk he had a simpler perspective on life as he focused more in victories and success.

With the series, Inoue wants the readers to feel achievements as well as love for the sport. Thinking that his success as a manga artist being largely due to basketball, Inoue organized a Slam Dunk Scholarship for Japanese students as he wanted to give back to the sport by increasing its popularity in Japan. However, when asked about the response from readers to basketball, Inoue commented that although Slam Dunk is technically a basketball manga, its story could have been done with other sports such as football. He also added that the artwork for the manga was mangalike in comparison to his newer works such as Real. His experiences with basketball also influenced the story from Slam Dunk: as a youth Inoue started playing basketball to be popular with the girls, but later became interested with the sport in and of itself. This was mirrored in the character of Hanamichi Sakuragi, who starts playing basketball to be popular with the girl he likes, to later become truly fond of the game.

Media

Manga

Written and illustrated by Takehiko Inoue, the series was originally published in Shueisha's shōnen manga magazine Weekly Shōnen Jump from October 1, 1990, to June 17, 1996. The 276 individual chapters were originally collected in 31 tankōbon volumes under Shueisha's Jump Comics imprint, with the first being published on February 8, 1991, and the final volume on October 3, 1996. It was later reassembled into 24 kanzenban volumes under the Jump Comics Deluxe imprint from March 19, 2001, to February 2, 2002. A 20 volume shinsōban edition was published between June 1, 2018, and September 1, 2018.

In North America, an English version of Slam Dunk was published by the now-defunct Gutsoon! Entertainment, which serialized the title in their manga anthology Raijin Comics from 2002 to 2004. Five collected volumes were published under Gutsoon's Raijin Graphic Novels imprint. They were released from July 2, 2003, until May 5, 2004. After Gutsoon! went out of business, the license for Slam Dunk was purchased by Viz Media, which published a preview of the series in the December 2007 issue of the North American edition of Shonen Jump. Slam Dunk began serialization in the magazine, starting with the May 2008 issue, as well as in tankōbon format with the first being published on September 2, 2008. As of December 3, 2013, Viz has published all 31 volumes of their translated edition.

10 Days After
In 2004, Inoue produced an epilogue titled Slam Dunk: 10 Days After, which was drawn on 23 chalkboards in the former campus of the defunct Misaki High School located in the Kanagawa Prefecture, and was held for public exhibition for three days between December 3 and 5. The epilogue, along with coverage of the event, was reprinted in the February 2005 issue of Switch magazine.

Anime

An anime series, consisting of 101 episodes, was produced by Toei Animation and directed by Nobutaka Nishizawa. It was first broadcast on TV Asahi from October 16, 1993, to March 23, 1996. It was later aired on the satellite television network, Animax, in addition to four animated movies produced. The anime followed the manga storyline, but left out the National Tournament games. Toei compiled the episodes into a series of seventeen DVDs which were released in Japan from December 10, 2004, to May 21, 2005. Toei once again collected the series in three DVD boxes during 2008. All the three boxes have a total of seventeen discs. To celebrate 20 years since its broadcast, the anime was released on Blu-ray format.

Toei and Geneon briefly teamed up to release the anime on DVD in North America after the manga was discontinued, though this was also discontinued after only a few volumes. The first DVD was released on March 15, 2005, and volume 4 was the last one released on June 14, 2005, before they were cancelled. Various episodes from the series were also downloadable in IGN's Direct2Drive service. Toei is currently streaming episodes of the series online for a fee and for free through Crunchyroll. Joost also started airing all 101 episodes as of May 2009 on their website.

The music was composed by Takanobu Masuda (from episode 1 to 61) and BMF (from episode 62 to 101). Three CD soundtracks were published during the airing of the series in Japan. The openings, ending and other two themes were collected into the CD soundtrack The Best of TV Animation Slam Dunk, released on July 21, 2003.

Films

Four films were produced by Toei Animation from 1994 to 1995 while the manga and TV series were still running. They contain largely new material that is either only hinted at or is not presented in the manga. From August 1 to 4, 2006, NHK broadcast all four movies as part of its satellite networks NHK BS-2's Summer Anime Choice line-up, and TV Osaka aired the last three movies from January 3 to 8, 2007. All the films were collected into a DVD box named Slam Dunk The Movie which was released on December 10, 2004.

The first film, simply titled Slam Dunk, premiered on March 12, 1994. Set after Shohoku's practice game against Ryonan (before the second half of episode 20), the film focuses on a practice game against Takezono High. Before the game, Sakuragi runs into Yoko Shimura, the girl who rejects him in the very first scene of the series, and Oda, the basketball player she rejected him for.  released on July 9, 1994, is the second film from the series. It happens during Shohoku's 4th Round Qualifying game against Tsukubu High (between the first half of episode 36). The film features original characters including Godai, an old friend of Akagi and Kogure's, Rango, a wild show-off who is in love with Haruko and quarrels with Sakuragi, and Coach Kawasaki, a former pupil of Anzai-sensei.  was released on March 4, 1995. Set after Shohoku's loss to Kainan, and during a practice match against Ryokufu High (between episode 61).  which was released one June 15, 1995, tells that Rukawa's middle school kouhai Ichiro Mizusawa will be paralyzed soon and wishes to have one last game against Rukawa (between the first half of episode 62).

On January 7, 2021, Slam Dunk'''s author Takehiko Inoue announced on his Twitter that the series will receive a new anime film by Toei Animation titled The First Slam Dunk. Inoue is the director and writer of the film, with Yasuyuki Ebara designing the characters. It premiered on December 3, 2022 in Japan.

Video games
Numerous video games based on the series, mostly developed by Banpresto and produced by Bandai, have been published for the Japanese market. Two basketball sims titled  and Slam Dunk 2 were released for the Game Boy. The Super Famicom had three games,   and SD Heat Up!!. Slam Dunk games have also been released for the Game Gear, Mega Drive, and Sega Saturn. A Slam Dunk coin-operated arcade game developed by Video System and published by Banpresto was released in 1995, which was called From TV Animation Slam Dunk: Super Slams. During development, the game was called 3 on 3 Dunk Madness and did not have the Slam Dunk license. Characters of the series also appear in the Nintendo DS games Jump Super Stars and Jump Ultimate Stars.

Unofficial game modifications have been made by fans for NBA 2K13 (PC Version).

Reception
MangaSlam Dunk won the 40th Shogakukan Manga Award in the shōnen category in 1994. It ranked second, only behind Kingdom, on the first annual Tsutaya Comic Awards' All-Time Best Section in 2017. In a poll of close to 79,000 Japanese for the 10th Japan Media Arts Festival in 2006, Slam Dunk was voted the #1 manga of all time. In the Japanese government's 2009 Media Arts 100 Poll of the public's favorite works of art of all time, Slam Dunk took first place in the manga division. In a survey from Oricon in 2009, it was ranked first as the manga that fans wanted to be turned into a live-action film.

In November 2014, readers of Media Factory's Da Vinci magazine voted Slam Dunk the fourth Weekly Shōnen Jumps greatest manga series of all time. On TV Asahi's Manga Sōsenkyo 2021 poll, in which 150,000 people voted for their top 100 manga series, Slam Dunk ranked third, only behind One Piece and Demon Slayer: Kimetsu no Yaiba.

French newspaper Le Figaro selected the series as one of their six recommended manga featured at the 2019 Paris Book Fair.

Sales
The collected volumes of Slam Dunk sold over 100 million copies by 2004, over 118 million by 2012, and over 121 million by 2014, making it Shueisha's fifth best-selling manga series. By 2017, the series had more than 170 million copies in circulation. Until it was broken in 2002, volumes 21 through 23 of Slam Dunk held the record for initial printing of a manga at 2.5 million copies. The print version of Slam Dunk: 10 Days After was popular, having initially ranked sixth and then 15th in Oricon's weekly ranking of manga. The first six volumes of the 2018 shinsōban edition of the original manga all reached the top eight of their release week, with the highest being the first volume at number two. This resulted in Slam Dunk being the fourth best-selling manga of 2018 with 5.2 million copies sold, and the ninth top-selling media franchise of 2018, with estimated sales of ¥3.4 billion. The English translation of the manga was listed as one of the best comics of 2008 by Publishers Weekly. Similarly, the Young Adult Library Services Association named the first volume one of its "Great Graphic Novels for Teens" in early 2009.

Critical reception
Carlo Santos of Anime News Network wrote that "With solid characters, eye-popping action, and a classic underdog story, Slam Dunk is what all manga series (and basketball players) should aspire to be: the complete package." Based on the first volume however, his colleague Carl Kimlinger said it came off as more of a romantic comedy than sports manga as it focused on establishing the cast. Santos opined that its the stuff that happens off the court that really makes up the manga's heart and soul as each character has a story to tell and a goal to reach, with the court simply providing a stage for them to "act out these universal struggles."

Kimlinger called Sakuragi an "inspired choice" for a lead character as he is a thug with a hair-trigger temper and all the wrong motivations, but said he does the "seemingly impossible" and balances likeability and extreme hubris thanks to humorous scenes. Santos wrote that while Sakuragi may not have the "mind-blowing superhuman skills" we normally associate with shōnen protagonists, watching him grow into a sportsman and decent human being is just as exciting. Despite having some "school-punk" character designs that are generally considered comedic nowadays, Santos called the art solid for its visual flow and sense of motion.

Legacy and impact
The success of Slam Dunk is cited as a cause for the increased popularity of basketball among the Japanese youth during the 1990s. Azusa Takahashi of Real Sound wrote that the appeal of Slam Dunk and the impact it had on the popularity of the sport is rooted in how realistic it is. It not only has flashy game scenes, but also includes scenes of steady practice. The Slam Dunk Scholarship program was created in 2006 by Inoue and Shueisha. The winning 17- to 18-year-old recipient receives a fully paid academic and athletic scholarship to a university-preparatory school in America if they pass the school's admission interview. In 2010, Inoue received special commendations from the Japan Basketball Association for helping popularize basketball in Japan and the scholarship program.

The anime adaptation has also been very popular in Japan. In TV Asahi's 2005 Top 100 Anime survey of multiple age groups, Slam Dunk ranked as the eighth most popular anime. In another poll from TV Asahi but developed by a website, the series ranked tenth. The home video release of the anime also had good sales, having appeared on Oricon's Japanese Animation DVD and Blu-ray rankings. PhD student Dexter Thomas of Cornell University, writing a dissertation about how race factors into hip hop in Japan, stated "The first wave of basketball in Japan was pushed forward by Slam Dunk''."

See also

 J. R. Sakuragi—Japanese-American basketball player, born J. R. Henderson, who chose Sakuragi's name after his naturalization

Notes

References

External links

 Slam Dunk Scholarship website at Shueisha 
 Slam Dunk  at Toei Animation
 

 
1990 manga
1993 anime television series debuts
1996 Japanese television series endings
Asia Television
Basketball in anime and manga
Comedy anime and manga
Coming-of-age anime and manga
Funimation
Madman Entertainment manga
School life in anime and manga
Shōnen manga
Shueisha franchises
Shueisha manga
Television shows set in Kanagawa Prefecture
Toei Animation television
TV Asahi original programming
Viz Media manga
Winners of the Shogakukan Manga Award for shōnen manga